The Kotorosl is a right tributary of the Volga in the Yaroslavl Oblast of Russia. The river flows from Lake Nero near Rostov past Karabikha and enters the Volga in Yaroslavl.

In the medieval ages, the river was highly important strategically, for it connected Rostov with major waterways of Russia. The Kotorosl's main tributary is the Ustye, which flows past Semibratovo to Borisogleb.

References 

Rivers of Yaroslavl Oblast